Pierre Leichtnam (9 September 1910 – 25 June 1994) was a French middle-distance runner. He competed in the men's 1500 metres at the 1936 Summer Olympics.

References

1910 births
1994 deaths
Athletes (track and field) at the 1936 Summer Olympics
French male middle-distance runners
Olympic athletes of France
Place of birth missing